Cootes is a surname. Notable people with the surname include:

Jim Cootes, Australian orchidologist
Joe Cootes, New Zealand rugby league player
John Cootes, Australian rugby league player and Roman Catholic priest 
Samuel Cootes (1792–1882), American merchant and lawyer

See also
Cootes Store, Virginia, an unincorporated community in Rockingham County, Virginia, USA
Cootes Paradise, the largest wetland at the western end of Lake Ontario, on the west side of Hamilton Harbour
Cootes Drive, a city street in Dundas, Ontario, Canada (now part of the city of Hamilton)
Coote (disambiguation)